Park Lane station is a DART Light Rail station in Dallas, Texas. It is located at Park Lane and Greenville Avenue, just east of Central Expressway, in North Dallas. It opened on January 10, 1997 and served as the northern terminus of the Red Line until July 1, 2002. The original station, which was at ground level, was replaced with an elevated station, the first of four on the DART Red Line. The nearby Walnut Hill station, of similar design, also opened with the current Park Lane station in July 2002. The original station is still present, however remains used for storage. This station serves NorthPark Center, nearby shops and Campbell Center.

External links
 DART - Park Lane Station

Dallas Area Rapid Transit light rail stations in Dallas
Railway stations in the United States opened in 1997
1997 establishments in Texas
Railway stations in Dallas County, Texas